Matej Mináč (born 1 April 1961) is a Slovak film director. He has directed three films about Nicholas Winton, a Briton who organised the rescue of 669 Jewish children from German-occupied Czechoslovakia on the eve of World War II in an operation later known as the Czech Kindertransport: the drama All My Loved Ones (1999), the documentary The Power of Good: Nicholas Winton (2002), which won an Emmy Award, and the documentary Nicky's Family (2011).

Awards 

 International EMMY AWARD for Best Documentary in 2002 (awarded by the International Academy of Television, Arts and Sciences - New York 2002)
 Nominated for the 2006 News and Documentary EMMY AWARD for HBO
 2006 Christopher AWARD - New York for an extraordinary humanistic message
 2009 CFTA AWARD within the Czech Lion for the best documentary from 1993 - 2007
 Wallenberg Medal - together with Patrik Pašš, award for the extraordinarily sensitively processed story of Sir Winton, thanks to which his message inspires people all over the world
 Best Documentary Award - Montreal World Film Festival 2011
 Audience Rights Award - Karlovy Vary IFF 2011
 Audio-Visual Memory Preservation Forum Award - Jerusalem Film Festival 2011
 SIGNIS Award World Catholic Association for Communication, uniting 140 countries, for the promotion and dissemination of human values - 64th PRIX ITALIA - Turin
 FIAT / IFTA (Achievement Award) for the best use of archives - British Film Institute, London 2012
 Grand Prix to director Matej Mináč for the discovering and human-deep theme of the film Nicky's Family - 52nd IFF of Films for Children and Youth Zlín - Czech Republic
 Award - David's Camera for the best music - Warsaw Jewish Film Festival, Poland
 Shoresh Audience Award - UK Jewish Film Festival, London, UK
 Audience Award - Palm Beach Jewish Film Festival - USA
 Audience Award - Best Documentary Feature Film 2012 - Sedona Int´l Film Festival - USA
 Audience Award - Best Documentary Feature 2012 - Atlanta Jewish Film Festival - USA
 Audience Award - Best Film 2012 - Charlotte Jewish Film Festival - USA
 Audience Award - Best Documentary 2012 - Denver Jewish Film Festival - USA
 Audience Award - Best Documentary Film 2012 - AJC Seattle Jewish Film Festival - USA
 Audience Award - Best Film 2012 - Houston Jewish Film Festival - USA
 Audience Award - Best Documentary Film -Hartford Jewish Film Festival
 Audience Award - Best Documentary 2012 - Pittsburgh Jewish Film Festival
 Audience Award - Best Film 2012 - Rockland Int´l Jewish Film Festival, USA
 Audience Award for Best Documentary - Zagreb Jewish Film Festival 2012, Croatia
 Award for the best director for the masterful use of narrative techniques, where the film story is presented through the personal perspective of the director - MECEFF festival - Romania
 Award of the Mayor of Piešťany - IFF Piešťany - Cinematik - 2011
 Ota Hofman Award of the Children's Film Festival and Television Festival in Ostrov - 2001
 Special jury prize for the work with the most significant moral accent
 Ota Hofman Children's Film and Television Festival - Ostrov - 2001
 Slovak Film Critics Award - in the category of Slovak feature and medium-length documentary with its premiere in 2011, Slovakia
 Creative Award for Film and Documentary Production - Annual National Creative Awards of the Slovak Film Association, the Union of Slovak Television Producers and the Literary Fund, Slovakia
 Audience Award - Best Film 2012, Scottsdale International Film Festival, USA
 GRAND PRIX - Best Film Festival, XVII International TV Festival Bar, Montenegro
 The best collection of films - Award for Czech Television, part of the collection is Nicky's family, XVII International TV Festival Bar, Montenegro
 Audience Award - Best Film, Three Rivers Film Festival 2012, USA
 Best Documentary Audience Award, Dayton Jewish International Film Festival 2013, USA
 Audience Award - Best Film - 10th European Film Festival, Buenos Aires, Argentina, 2013
 Russian Journalists Association Award - Yalta, 2013
 Audience Award - Best Documentary, Jewish Arts & Film Festival of Fairfield County 2013
 Award for Best Documentary, Victoria Film Festival 2014
 SPECIAL AWARD for director and ASPIM EUROPA AWARD at Torino
 International film festival The Spirits of the Earth - 2014
 FITES Award - TRILOBIT (Czech Film and Television Association)
 IGRIC Award (Slovak Film Association, Union of Slovak Television Producers)
 Jury Prize - Troia International Film Festival - Portugal
 Nine Gates Festival Award
 First prize - Warsaw Jewish Film Festival - Poland
 Spirit Award - Pacific Jewish Film Festival - USA
 Audience Awards: Washington Jewish Film Festival, Miami Jewish Film Festival
 Troia Int´l Film Festival - Portugal - Jury Prize,
 Coachella Valley's Festival - Best Film (USA)
 Grand Prix - Int´l Film Festival Sedona, USA;
 Czech lion for Jiří Bartoška for the best supporting role,
 IGRIC 2000 Award of the Slovak Film Association
 Audience Awards: Int´t Palm Springs Film Festival - USA (rated by the audience as the second best film of 180 feature films, Final Pilsen, Washington Jewish Film Festival, São Paulo Jewish Film Festival, Festivals of Festivals - Palm Springs (2001), Würzburg Film Festival (Germany, 2002), Atlanta Jewish Film Festival (2002)
 AWARD - CAMERA OF DAVID, best documentary and
 MAIN PRIZE - for the 13th Warsaw Jewish Film Festival (November 2015)
 GOLDEN REMI AWARD for Best Documentary at the 49th Annual International Film Festival - WORLDFEST HOUSTON

References

External links

Slovak film directors
Film people from Bratislava
1961 births
Living people